Sadat Rural District is a rural district (dehestan) in the Central District of Lali County, Khuzestan Province, Iran. At the 2006 census, its population was 5,465, in 948 families.  The rural district has 38 villages.

References 

Rural Districts of Khuzestan Province
Lali County